Ring of Fire is the second studio album released by Mark Boals. After the album, Mark and others who worked on the album formed the band Ring of Fire, in its name.

Track listing
All songs written by Mark Boals/Tony MacAlpine except where noted.

 "Ring of Fire" – 4:01
 "Atlantis" – 7:33 (Boals/Vitalij Kuprij)
 "Bringer of Pain" – 4:04
 "Betrayer" – 3:38 (Boals)
 "Keeper of the Flame" – 4:59 (Boals)
 "The Hunted" – 3:19 (Boals)
 "The Quest" – 4:11 (Boals)
 "Dreamer" – 6:11
 "Death Row" – 3:42
 "Alone" – 5:17
 "Battle of the Titan" – 3:27
 "Nessun Dorma" (bonus track for Japan) - 3:25 (Giacomo Puccini)

Personnel
Mark Boals – vocals, guitars and bass guitar
Tony MacAlpine – guitars and bass guitar
Vitalij Kuprij – keyboards
Virgil Donati – drums

Production
Engineer – Barry Conley
Mixing – Barry Conley
Cover art – Eric Philippe

External links
Heavy Harmonies page

Mark Boals albums
2000 albums
Frontiers Records albums